The Colombian leaf-toed gecko (Phyllodactylus transversalis) is a species of gecko endemic to Malpelo Island off Colombia.

References

Phyllodactylus
Reptiles of Colombia
Reptiles described in 1975